Daniel King may refer to:

Daniel P. King (1801–1850), U.S. Representative from Massachusetts
Danny King (speedway rider) (born 1986), motorcycle speedway rider from the United Kingdom
Daniel King (chess player) (born 1963), English chess grandmaster
Danny King (author) (born 1969), English author of The Burglar Diaries
Daniel King (cryptanalyst), United States Navy cryptanalyst who first confessed to, and then recanted, spying on the USA
Daniel King (racewalker) (born 1983), British racewalker
Daniel King (cricketer, born 1784) (1784–1836), English cricketer
Daniel King (cricketer, born 1983), Australian cricketer and classicist

See also
 Dan King (disambiguation)